Westmere is a lake and rural community in the Whanganui District and Manawatū-Whanganui region of New Zealand's North Island.

The settlement was established in the late 19th century, with a school being opened near the lake in 1894. Seven generations of the Laird family have been involved in the school, including school co-founder Alex Laird and founding teacher Emma Laird. The buildings were built by local families, and the soil for the grounds was transported with horses and drays from local farms.

Former residents include Wellington paediatrician Dr Brierley Emmett and concert pianist Liam Wooding.

Education

Between 1994 and 2006, under principal Bill Greening, the school was rebuilt with two new adventure playgrounds. The school board of trustees and parent trustee association raised an average of $30,000 per annum to fund the improvements.

References 

Whanganui District
Populated places in Manawatū-Whanganui
Lakes of Manawatū-Whanganui